The Taça FPF is a Brazilian football tournament played in the second half of the year. A spot in the Copa do Brasil and in the Campeonato Brasileiro Série D is granted for the winner of the competition. The winner of the cup also competes in the Recopa Sul-Brasileira. The competition is organized by the Paraná State Football Federation.

Titles in chronological order

Titles by team
2 titles
Atlético Paranaense
Maringá
1 title
Grêmio Maringá
Operário Ferroviário
J. Malucelli
Londrina
Roma de Apucarana
Nacional de Rolândia

References

Par
Football competitions in Paraná (state)